Malacolimax wiktori is a species of air-breathing land slug, a terrestrial pulmonate gastropod mollusk in the family Limacidae, the keelback slugs.

This species is endemic to the Canary Islands.
Endemic fauna of the Canary Islands

References

Limacidae
Gastropods described in 1989
Taxonomy articles created by Polbot